Sant Pau was a Spanish restaurant in Sant Pol de Mar, Catalonia (Spain), a town between Barcelona and Girona. In 2009 it was awarded three Michelin stars and three Campsa-Repsol suns. Its chef is Carme Ruscalleda, and the dining room was directed by Toni Balam. In 2006 Sant Pau opened a branch in Chuo-ku, Tokyo which currently has 2 Michelin stars.

In 2018, Carme Ruscalleda closed the restaurant in Sant Pol de Mar.

Awards

 1992 They represent Catalan cooking in Sevilla's Universal Exposition.
 1995 Price Best Chef, by the guide Lo mejor de la gastronomía
 Medalla al Mèrit Cívic, by Obra del Ballet Popular
 1997 Price Restaurant Of the Year, by Gourmetour
 1998 Premio Nacional de Gastronomía, by Academia Española de Gastronomía, Cofradía de la Buena Mesa and Secretaría de Estado y Turismo de España.
 Price Sánchez Cotán, by Academia Española de Gastronomía
 Price Davidoff
 Price Nadal de la Gastronomia for being the Restaurant of the Year
 Price Chef of the Year to Carme Ruscalleda
 2000 Price Golden Chef to Carme Ruscalleda, by Intxaurrondoko Gastronomi Elkartea
 2001 Price Dona Emprenedora to Carme Ruscalleda, by FIDEM
 2004 Price Restaurant Of the Year, by Gourmetour
 2008 Creu de Sant Jordi to Carme Ruscalleda, by Generalitat de Catalunya

See also
 List of Spanish restaurants

References

External links

Official website

1988 establishments in Catalonia
Restaurants in Catalonia
Michelin Guide starred restaurants in Spain
Maresme
Spanish restaurants
Restaurants established in 1988
Spanish companies established in 1988